Together is a short film drama directed by Eicke Bettinga and starring Matt Smith. The film premiered in the International Critics' Week section at the 2009 Cannes Film Festival.

Premise
A year after his brother's death, Rob discovers that the only way to help his father cope with the loss is to "force" his affection onto him.

Critical reception
"How fine is the line that separates an unilateral embrace from a struggle? Eicke Bettinga reinvents the elaboration of a loss, starting from suffused grief to explode in a climax where the only language that still seems to have any meaning is that of the body." - Milano Film Festival.

"Together focuses the narrative on an emotional build-up rather than on momentous explanations and futile dialogue. Gazes, pauses, and gestures reveal more about the relationships than words could suggest." - Nisimazine, Cannes 2009.

References

Notes

External links
 Watch the film on iTunes (official release)
 Watch the film on Amazon Video (official release)
 Official Fanpage on Facebook
 

2009 short films
2009 films
British drama short films
2000s English-language films
2000s British films